Matthew P. Scott is an American biologist who was the tenth president of the Carnegie Institution for Science. While at Stanford University, Scott studied how embryonic and later development is governed by proteins that control gene activity and cell signaling processes.
 He co- discovered homeobox genes in Drosophila melanogaster working with Amy J. Weiner at Indiana University.

Among his laboratory's discoveries, he is recognized for the cloning of the patched gene family and demonstration that a human homolog PTCH1 is a key tumor suppressor gene for the Hedgehog signaling pathway as well as the causative gene for the nevoid basal cell carcinoma syndrome, or Gorlin syndrome.

Education
Scott was educated at Massachusetts Institute of Technology.

Career and research
Scott served on the faculty of the Department of Molecular, Cellular, and Developmental Biology at the University of Colorado starting in 1983. He moved to Stanford University in 1990 to join the faculty of the Department of Developmental Biology and the Department of Genetics. From 2002-2007 he served as Chair of Bio-X, Stanford's interdisciplinary biosciences program.

Awards and honors
 1983 - Helen Hay Whitney postdoctoral fellowship
 1985 - Searle Scholar
 2004 - Conklin Medal, Society for Developmental Biology
 1999 - Member, United States National Academy of Sciences
 2007 - Member, National Institute of Medicine

Personal life
He is married to Stanford developmental geneticist Margaret T. Fuller.

References

21st-century American biologists
Living people
Place of birth missing (living people)
Year of birth missing (living people)
Massachusetts Institute of Technology alumni
Stanford University School of Medicine faculty
Members of the United States National Academy of Sciences
Howard Hughes Medical Investigators
Members of the National Academy of Medicine